The right marginal branch of right coronary artery (or right marginal artery) is the largest marginal branch of the right coronary artery. It follows the acute margin of the heart. It supplies blood to both surfaces of the right ventricle.

Structure 
The right marginal branch is the largest branch to split off from the right coronary artery. It often anastomoses with the nearby parallel posterior interventricular artery, which itself is usually a continuation of the right coronary artery.

Variation 
The right marginal branch may reach the distal part of the posterior interventricular sulcus.

Function 
The right marginal branch primarily supplies the right ventricle.

Additional images

References

External links
  - "Anterior view of the heart."
 Image
 Image at clevelandclinic.org

Arteries of the thorax